For other places with the same name, see Kitagata (disambiguation).

 was a town located in Kishima District, Saga Prefecture, Japan.

On March 1, 2006, Kitagata, along with the town of Yamauchi (also from Kishima District), was merged into the expanded city of Takeo.

Geography
Rivers: Rokkaku River

Adjoining municipalities
Ōmachi
Shiroishi
Takeo
Taku

History
During the Edo period the Nagasaki Kaidō passed through Kitagata. During the Meiji period the Nishiki coal mine was operated and the coal industry flourished. However, it closed in 1960.

April 1, 1889 - The modern system of municipalities was established. The area consisted of two villages: Kitagata and Hashishita.
April 29, 1944 - Kitagata Village became Kitagata Town.
April 1, 1956 - Part of Hashishita Village was incorporated into Kitagata Town. The remaining part was incorporated into Shiroishi Town.

Education
Kitagata Junior High School
Kitagata Elementary School

Transportation

Rail
JR Kyushu
Sasebo Line
Kitagata Station

Road
Expressways
Nagasaki Expressway
Takeo-Kitagata Interchange
National highways
Route 34
Main prefectural roads
Saga Prefectural Route 25 (Taku-Wakagi)
Saga Prefectural Route 36 (Takeo-Fukudomi)

Notable places
Shiki no Oka Park
Daishō-ji

Dissolved municipalities of Saga Prefecture